Pheggomisetes is a genus of beetles in the family Carabidae, containing the following species:

 Pheggomisetes buresi (Knirsch, 1923)
 Pheggomisetes globiceps Burasch, 1925
 Pheggomisetes radevi Knirsch, 1924

References

Trechinae